Arabesque is a Romanian company based in Galați, which distributes building materials and operates hardware stores. The network comprises 7 Mathaus DIY stores and 22 Arabesque warehouses in Romania. It also operates 6 warehouses in Republic of Moldova, Bulgaria and Ukraine.
The company was founded in 1994 and is owned by Romanian businessman Cezar Rapotan who also owns shares of the manufacturer of steel structures Sibel FIERCTC and of the energy solutions company Chorus Marketing and Distribution.

The first warehouse outside Romania was opened in 2005, in Chisinau, Republic of Moldova, as Arabesque Construct.

In July 2006, Arabesque has acquired the Budmax network, the third largest player in the building materials business-to-business market in Ukraine. In 2020 Arabesque still operates only 3 of the 10 warehouses that still operate under the Budmax brand in Ukraine.

Arabesque also owns in Bulgaria a Budmax warehouse in Sofia since 2006 and in Burgas since 2007.

References

Retail companies established in 1994
Hardware stores
Retail companies of Romania